Sir Henry Cooper  (3 May 19341 May 2011) was a British heavyweight boxer. He was undefeated in British and Commonwealth heavyweight championship contests for twelve years and held the European heavyweight title for three years. In a 1963 fight against a young Cassius Clay, he knocked Clay down before the fight was stopped because of a cut to his eye. In 1966 he fought Clay, who was then world heavyweight champion, for a second time and again lost to an eye injury. Cooper was twice voted BBC Sports Personality of the Year and, after retiring in 1971 following a controversial loss to Joe Bugner, remained a popular public figure. He is the only British boxer to have been awarded a knighthood.

Early life

Cooper was born on 3 May 1934 in Lambeth, London to Henry Snr and Lily Cooper. With identical twin brother, George (1934–2010), and elder brother Bern, he grew up in a council house on Farmstead Road on the Bellingham Estate in South East London. During the Second World War they were evacuated to Lancing on the Sussex coast.

Life was tough in the latter years of the Second World War, and London life especially brought many dangers during the blackout. Cooper took up many jobs, including a paper round before school, and made money out of recycling golf balls to the clubhouse on the Beckenham course. All three of the Cooper brothers excelled in sport, with George and Henry exercising talents particularly in football and also cricket. Cooper started his boxing career in 1949, as an amateur with the Bellingham Boxing Club based at Athelney St School in Bellingham which was run and founded by Albert Colley and won seventy-three of eighty-four contests. At the age of seventeen, he won the first of two ABA light-heavyweight titles before National Service in the Royal Army Ordnance Corps as Private Service Number 22486464,

1952 Olympics
Cooper represented Great Britain as a light heavyweight boxer at the 1952 Helsinki Olympics.  His results were: Round of 32-bye, Round of 16-lost to Anatoly Perov (Soviet Union) by decision, 1-2.

Professional boxing career

Style
Although Cooper was left-handed, he used the "orthodox" stance, with his strongest (left) hand and foot forward, rather than the reversed "southpaw" stance more usually adopted by a left-handed boxer. Opponents were thus hit hardest with punches which Cooper could throw from his front hand, closest to the opponent. At its most effective, his hook had an upward uppercut-like trajectory. A formidable left jab, from which he could hook quickly, completed his offensive repertoire. While cut-prone and no great defensive technician, Cooper compensated by forcing the action in his bouts. After developing a left shoulder problem in the latter half of his career, he adjusted to put more stress on right-handed punches.

Early bouts
Henry and his identical twin brother, George (boxing under the name Jim) turned professional together under the management of Jim Wicks. Wicks had a reputation for not overmatching his boxers and looking out for their interests; however, the very cut-prone Cooper was slow to fulfil his potential and early title challenges were unsuccessful, with losses to West Indian Joe Bygraves for the Commonwealth belt (KO 9), Ingemar Johansson for the European belt (KO 5), and the undersized but highly skilled Joe Erskine (PTS 15) for the British and Commonwealth. An impressive points win over top American heavyweight Zora Folley was followed by a second-round KO loss to Folley.

British and Commonwealth Champion
For Cooper 1959 was a banner year: he took the British and Commonwealth titles from Brian London in 15 rounds and received the last 9-carat gold Lonsdale Belt after successful defences against Dick Richardson (KO 5), Joe Erskine (TKO 5 and TKO 12), and Johnny Prescott (TKO 10). Another points win over London brought an offer to fight Floyd Patterson for his world heavyweight title, but this was turned down by Cooper (or Wicks).

Muhammad Ali

In 1963 Muhammad Ali (then known as Cassius Clay and a contender for the world heavyweight title) created a great deal of ticket-selling publicity before his London bout with Cooper, who many British fans hoped would be able to humble the brash young American. In the boxing world, however, Ali was considered a future world champion and Cooper the underdog. The contest took place at Wembley Stadium, Wembley Park. According to the official weigh-in, Ali outweighed Cooper by 21 pounds, Cooper said he wore weighted clothing and was near the light heavyweight limit. Cooper had devised his own training regimen and felt that though lighter he was in the best condition of his career. Ali's size, mobility, fast reflexes, and unorthodox defensive tactic of pulling back from punches made him a frustratingly elusive opponent, and Cooper was later accused by Ali's camp of hitting on the break.
With hardly any attempt at effective aggression by Ali, Cooper was leading on points, but during the fourth round had connected with a solitary left hook to the body; in the fourth's final seconds, Cooper felled Ali with an upward angled version of his trademark left hook to the jaw, "Enry's 'Ammer". Ali partly landed on the ropes, preventing his head hitting the canvas covered boards, but though up at the count of 3 he seemed hurt.In the corner Dundee was angry and slapped Ali's legs. Ali misunderstood and tried to get off the stool. It has been claimed that Dundee may have used smelling salts to revive Ali. This has never been confirmed and the film is unclear if this happened. The use of smelling salts was prohibited in British boxing, and their use would have led to Ali losing by disqualification if the offence was proved. Dundee later said that he put his finger in a small tear in one of Ali's gloves to demonstrate to the referee and told the referee that his fighter needed replacements, but none were available. Cooper insisted that resulted in a delay of a minute or more in addition to the regulation time between rounds, and denied him a chance to finish off Ali while he was still dazed. A tape of the fight showed an interval extension of only an extra six seconds.

Cooper was the only person present who recalled a longer delay and because the surviving BBC tape of the bout is only of what was actually broadcast, it has been claimed a longer delay may have been edited out for transmission. Study of the tape shows no break and the commentary is also unbroken so the 6 second interval extension is correct. Ali started the 5th round aggressively, attempting to make good his prediction of a 5th round knockout and opened a severe cut under Cooper's eye. Ali hit Cooper with a succession of hard rights knocking out his gumshield and Cooper's corner threw in the towel. Referee Tommy Little stopped the fight, and thus Ali defeated Cooper by technical knockout.

Subsequently a spare pair of gloves was always required at ringside. On the 40th anniversary of the fight, Ali telephoned Cooper to reminisce. In 1966 Cooper fought Ali for the heavyweight championship, for a second time at Arsenal Stadium, Highbury. However, Ali was now alert to the danger posed by Cooper's left and more cautious than he had been in the previous contest; he held Cooper in a vice-like grip during clinches, and when told to break leapt backward several feet. Accumulated scar tissue around Cooper's eyes made him more vulnerable than in the previous meeting and a serious cut was opened by Ali, which led to the fight being stopped, Cooper again losing to Ali via technical knockout.

Later fights
After a fourth round knockout loss to former world heavyweight champion Floyd Patterson in 1966, Cooper went undefeated until the final contest of his career. The successful defences of his British and Commonwealth titles against the likes of uniquely awkward Jack Bodell (TKO 2 and PTS 15) and media-savvy Billy Walker (TKO 6) made Cooper the only man to win three Lonsdale Belts. With a win over Karl Mildenberger in 1968 Cooper added the European crown and made two successful defences.

In May 1971, a 36-year-old Cooper faced 21-year-old Joe Bugner, one of the biggest heavyweights in the world for the British, European, and Commonwealth belts. Referee Harry Gibbs awarded the fight to Bugner by a quarter of a point score (which was subsequently abolished partly because of the controversy that followed). An audience mainly composed of Cooper fans did not appreciate the innately cautious Bugner, and the decision was booed with commentator Harry Carpenter asking, "And how, in the world, can you take away the man's three titles, like that?" Cooper announced his retirement shortly afterwards. Cooper refused to speak to Gibbs for many years, but eventually agreed to shake his hand while they were at a charity event.

Opinion on modern boxers
In Cooper's later years, he retired from commentary on the sport as he became "disillusioned with boxing", wanting "straight, hard and fast boxing that he was used to from his times." While acknowledging that he was from a different era and would not be fighting as a heavyweight today, Cooper was nonetheless critical of the trend for heavyweights to bulk up as he thought it made for one-paced and less entertaining contests. In his final year, he said that he did not think boxing was "as good as it was", naming Joe Calzaghe, Ricky Hatton, and Amir Khan as "the best of their era", but asserting that "if you match them up with the champions of thirty or forty years ago I don't think they're as good".

Life outside boxing
In the 1960s Cooper appeared in several public information films concerning road safety, promoting the use of zebra crossings: such as "The Story of Elsie Billing". After his retirement from boxing, he maintained a public profile with appearances in the BBC quiz show A Question of Sport and various advertisements, most famously in those for Brut aftershave. He was also a frequent guest speaker for charity fund-raising events. He appeared as boxer John Gully in the 1975 film Royal Flash and in his latter years featured in a series of UK public service announcements urging vulnerable groups to go to their doctors for vaccination against influenza called Get your Jab in First!

Cooper became a "Name" at Lloyd's of London, which was a supposedly safe investment, but in the 1990s he was reportedly one of those who suffered enormous personal losses because of the unlimited liability which a "Name" was then responsible for, being forced to sell his Lonsdale belts. Subsequently, Cooper's popularity as an after dinner speaker provided a source of income, and he was in most respects a picture of contentment although becoming more subdued in the years following his wife's sudden death aged 71.

Considering his long career, Cooper had suffered relatively little boxing-related damage to his health, and apart from "a bit of arthritis" remained an imposing figure: in the words of one journalist, "the living manifestation of an age of tuxedos in ringside seats, Harry Carpenter commentaries, sponge buckets and 'seconds out'". He lived in Hildenborough, Kent, where he was the president of Nizels Golf Club.

Cooper was married to Albina Genepri from 1960 until 2008 (her death). He converted to her Catholic faith and described Albina, who "hated" his sport, as "an ideal wife for a boxer", never grumbling about his long absences before big fights and inviting journalists in for tea while they waited for Cooper to get out of bed the morning after bouts. He was survived by their sons and two grandchildren.

Cooper was a lifelong Arsenal supporter.

Awards and honours

Cooper was the first to win the BBC Sports Personality of the Year award twice, in 1967 for going unbeaten and in 1970, when Cooper had become the British, Commonwealth, and European heavyweight champion. He is the only British boxer to win three Lonsdale Belts outright.

Cooper was appointed an Officer of the Order of the British Empire (OBE) in 1969, awarded a Papal Knighthood in 1978, and was knighted in 2000. He is also celebrated as one of the great Londoners in the "London Song" by Ray Davies on his 1998 album The Storyteller. He was the subject of This Is Your Life in 1970 when he was surprised by Eamonn Andrews at Thames Television's Euston Road Studios.

Professional boxing record

References

External links
 Remembering Clay v Cooper East Side Boxing, 14 November 2006
 

|-

|-

1934 births
2011 deaths
British identical twins
Military personnel from London
20th-century British Army personnel
BBC Sports Personality of the Year winners
Boxers at the 1952 Summer Olympics
Contestants on British game shows
Converts to Roman Catholicism
English male boxers
English Roman Catholics
Heavyweight boxers
Knights Bachelor
Knights of St. Gregory the Great
Officers of the Order of the British Empire
Olympic boxers of Great Britain
People from Catford
People from Hildenborough
Royal Army Ordnance Corps soldiers
People in sports awarded knighthoods
Boxers from Greater London
European Boxing Union champions
Twin sportspeople
English twins
People from Lewisham